Babiyachaur  is a village development committee in Surkhet District, Karnali Province, of mid-western Nepal. At the time of the 2011 Nepal census it had a population of 8517 people living in 1589 individual households. Brahman, Chhetri, Magar, Kami, Damai are the major ethnic groups.

References

External links
UN map of the municipalities of Surkhet District

Populated places in Surkhet District